The Columbian Exchange: Biological and Cultural Consequences of 1492  is a 1972 book on the Columbian exchange by Alfred W. Crosby.

Reception
Various academic authorities have reviewed the book.  In the foreword to the 2003 edition of the book, J. R. McNeill says that in 1972 "Crosby's ideas met with indifference from most historians, neglect from many publishers, and hostility from at least some reviewers, (but) they now figure prominently in conventional presentations of modern history."

Today, the book is a founding text of the field of environmental history.  Its themes have been expanded upon and popularized by later works such as 1491: New Revelations of the Americas Before Columbus (2005) and 1493: Uncovering the New World Columbus Created (2012) by Charles C. Mann.

References

1972 non-fiction books
Environmental history
Non-fiction books about indigenous peoples of the Americas
1972 in the environment